Huff Creek is a tributary of the Guyandotte River,  long, in southern West Virginia in the United States. The creek was named after Peter Huff, an early settler.

Downstream from Lacoma, the creek is paralleled by West Virginia Route 10.

According to the West Virginia Department of Environmental Protection, approximately 97% of the Huff Creek watershed is forested, mostly deciduous.

See also
List of rivers of West Virginia

References 

Rivers of West Virginia
Tributaries of the Guyandotte River
Rivers of Wyoming County, West Virginia
Rivers of Logan County, West Virginia